Suining (Sichuanese Pinyin: Xu4nin2;) is a prefecture-level city of eastern Sichuan province in Southwest China. In 2002, Suining had a population of 658,798.

Geography and climate

Suining is located in the center of the Sichuan Basin and on the central reaches of the Fu River, bordering Chongqing, Guang'an and Nanchong to the east, Neijiang and Ziyang to the south, the provincial capital of Chengdu to the west, and Deyang and Mianyang to the north. While much of the prefecture is mountainous, the urban area itself, which occupies , is located on flat land.

Suining has a monsoon-influenced humid subtropical climate (Köppen Cwa) and is largely mild and humid, with four distinct seasons. Winter is short, mild, and foggy, though actual precipitation is low. January averages , and while frost may occur, snow is rare. Rainfall is light in winter and can be heavy in summer, and 75% of the annual total occurs from May to September.

Places of interest
According to local legend, Suining is the Hometown of Guanyin and her sisters. A folk song declares that one resides at Lingquan Temple, another at Guangde Temple, while only the third sister is afar, in the Putuo Mountains of Southern China.

There exists Lingquan Temple, Guangde Temple, and the Dead Sea, which are regarded as the 4A scenic zone. And there is also a Celadon Museum of Sichuan, which is referred to as a 3A scenic zone.

The percentage of land-covered forests of Suining is approximately 34%, it's the first Provincial Environmental Protection City in Sichuan. The 30,000-capacity Suining Sports Centre Stadium is located in the city. The stadium opened in 2014 and it is used mostly for football matches.

Administrative divisions

Transport

Highway
China National Highway 318

Rail
Suining is the junction for the Dazhou–Chengdu and Suining–Chongqing Railways, which collective form the westernmost section of the Shanghai–Wuhan–Chengdu High-Speed Railway.

Well-known inhabitants
Chen Zi'ang, Tang dynasty poet (661-702), was a native of the Suining area.
Chen Wei, a pro-democracy activist born in 1969 who has been arrested in February 2011 and sentenced for 9-years in prison on December 23, 2011 for "inciting subversion of state power" by the Suining intermediate people's court.
Liu Xianbin, a pro-democracy activist born in 1968 who has been arrested in June 2010 and sentenced for 10-years in prison for inciting subversion of state power.
Li Bifeng, a pro-democracy activist and friend of Liao Yiwu who is facing 5-years prison for "economic crimes".
Ju Jingyi, a well-known Chinese singer and actress. She rose to fame as a member of Chinese idol girl group SNH48 and was part of Team NII until her graduation in December 2017.

References

 
Cities in Sichuan
Prefecture-level divisions of Sichuan